The most notable event of the year was the Arab Spring that involved the killing of Muammar Gaddafi in Libya as part of a series of protests and government overthrows that swept through the Middle East.

2011 was designated as: 
International Year of Forests
International Year of Chemistry
International Year for People of African Descent

In 2011, the nation of Samoa only had 364 days as it moved across the International Date Line skipping December 30, 2011; it is now 24 hours ahead of American Samoa.

Events

January

 January 1
 Estonia officially adopts the Euro currency and becomes the 17th Eurozone country.
 A bomb explodes as Coptic Christians in Alexandria, Egypt leave a new year service, killing 23 people.
 Flight 348 with 134 occupants, operated by Kolavia, catches fire while taxiing out for take-off. Three people are killed and 43 were injured, four critically, from smoke inhalation or burns.
 January 4 – Tunisian street vendor Mohamed Bouazizi dies after setting himself on fire a month earlier, sparking anti-government protests in Tunisia and later other Arab nations. These protests become known collectively as the Arab Spring.
January 5 – Internet vigilante group Anonymous launches DoS attacks on Syrian, Tunisian, Bahraini, Egyptian, Libyan, and Jordanian government websites in response to the Arab Spring protests.
 January 9 – Iran Air Flight 277 crashes near Orumiyeh in the northeast of the country, killing 78 people.
 January 14 – The Tunisian government falls after a month of increasingly violent protests; President Zine El Abidine Ben Ali flees to Saudi Arabia after 23 years in power.
 January 15 – The result of the South Sudanese independence referendum, 2011 is in favour of independence, paving the way for the creation of the new state in July.
 January 24 – 37 people are killed and more than 180 others wounded in a bombing at Domodedovo International Airport in Moscow, Russia.
 January 25 – The 2011 Egyptian revolution begins.
 January 27 – Within Ursa Minor, H1504+65, a white dwarf with the hottest known surface temperature in the universe at 200,000 K, was documented.

February
 February 11 – Egyptian President Hosni Mubarak resigns after widespread protests calling for his departure, leaving control of Egypt in the hands of the military until a general election can be held.
 February 15  – The First Libyan Civil War starts.
 February 22 – March 14 – Uncertainty over Libyan oil output causes crude oil prices to rise 20% over a two-week period following the Arab Spring, causing the 2011 energy crisis.
 February 22 – A 6.3 magnitude earthquake strikes Christchurch, in what became New Zealand's third-deadliest natural disaster. Over 180 people were killed, many within the CTV Building, including many foreign citizens. Many foreign search and rescue workers responded to the event.

March
 March 6 – Civil uprising phase of the Syrian Civil War is triggered when 15 youths in Daraa are arrested for scrawling graffiti on their school wall denouncing the regime of President Bashar al-Assad.
 March 11 – A 9.1-magnitude earthquake and subsequent tsunami hit the east of Japan, killing 15,840 and leaving another 3,926 missing. Tsunami warnings are issued in 50 countries and territories. Emergencies are declared at four nuclear power plants affected by the quake.
 March 15
 Hamad bin Isa Al Khalifa, King of Bahrain, declares a three-month state of emergency as troops from the Gulf Co-operation Council are sent to quell the civil unrest.
 Protests breakout across Syria demanding democratic reforms, resignation of President Bashar al-Assad, and release of those imprisoned for the March 6 Daraa protest. The government responds by killing hundreds of protesters and laying siege to various cities, beginning the Syrian Civil War.
 March 17 – The United Nations Security Council votes 10–0 to create a no-fly zone over Libya in response to allegations of government aggression against civilians.
 March 19 – In light of continuing attacks on Libyan rebels by forces in support of leader Muammar Gaddafi, military intervention authorized under UNSCR 1973 begins as French fighter jets make reconnaissance flights over Libya.

April
 April 2 – India wins the 2011 Cricket World Cup.
 April 7 – The Israel Defense Forces use their Iron Dome missile system to successfully intercept a BM-21 Grad launched from Gaza, marking the first short-range missile intercept ever.
 April 11 – Former Ivorian President Laurent Gbagbo is arrested in his home in Abidjan by supporters of elected President Alassane Ouattara, with support from French forces; this effectively ends the 2010–11 Ivorian crisis and civil war.
 April 15 – The Mexican town of Cherán is taken over by vigilantes in response to abuses from the local drug cartel. The new government is strongly focused on crime reduction and preserving the local environment.
 April 17 – The 2011 PlayStation Network outage begins, becoming one of the largest data breaches ever recorded,      and exposed personal data from 77 million accounts on the platform. The outage lasted 23 days.
April 24 – The 2011 Guantanamo Bay files leak occurs, WikiLeaks and other organisations publishing 779 classified documents about Guantanamo Bay detainees, and it had been exposed 150 innocent citizens from Afghanistan and Pakistan were held in the camp without trial and detainees being as young as 14 years old.
 April 25–28 – The 2011 Super Outbreak forms in the Southern, Midwest and Eastern United States with a tornado count of 362; killing 324 and injuring over 2,200.
 April 29 – An estimated two billion people watch the royal wedding of Prince William, Duke of Cambridge and Catherine Middleton at Westminster Abbey in London.

May

 May 1 – U.S. President Barack Obama announces that Osama bin Laden, the founder and leader of the militant group Al-Qaeda, was killed on May 2, 2011 (PKT, UTC+05) during an American military operation in Pakistan.
 May 5 – Supremo Tribunal Federal approves wedding between people of the same gender in Brazil.
 May 10–14 – The Eurovision Song Contest 2011 takes place in Düsseldorf, Germany, and is won by Azeri entrants Ell & Nikki with the song "Running Scared".
 May 16 – The European Union agrees to a €78 billion rescue deal for Portugal. The bailout loan will be equally split between the European Financial Stabilisation Mechanism, the European Financial Stability Facility, and the International Monetary Fund.
 May 21 – Grímsvötn, Iceland's most active volcano, erupts and causes disruption to air travel in Northwestern Europe.
 May 22 – The 2011 Joplin tornado, an EF5 tornado, strikes Joplin, Missouri, killing 158 and injuring 1,150.
May 26 – Former Bosnian Serb Army commander Ratko Mladić, wanted for genocide, war crimes and crimes against humanity, is arrested in Serbia.

June
 June 4 – Chile's Puyehue volcano erupts, causing air traffic cancellations across South America, New Zealand and Australia, and forcing over 3,000 people to evacuate.
 June 26 – July 17 – The 2011 FIFA Women's World Cup takes place in Germany and is won by Japan.
 June 28 – The Food and Agriculture Organization announces the eradication of the cattle plague rinderpest from the world.

July
 July 6 – The International Olympic Committee awards PyeongChang the right to host the 2018 Winter Olympics.
 July 9 – South Sudan secedes from Sudan, per the result of the independence referendum held in January.
 July 12 – The planet Neptune completes its first orbit since it was discovered in 1846. 
 July 14 – South Sudan joins the United Nations as the 193rd member.
 July 14–23 two frontal systems enter south-central Chile causing great snowfalls that leaves thousand of people isolated.
 July 20
 Goran Hadžić is detained in Serbia, becoming the last of 161 people indicted by the International Criminal Tribunal for the former Yugoslavia.
 The United Nations declares a famine in southern Somalia, the first in over 30 years.
 Mauno Koivisto becomes the oldest living President of Finland in the history of the nation, surpassing Kaarlo Juho Ståhlberg.
 July 21 – Space Shuttle Atlantis lands successfully at Kennedy Space Center after completing STS-135, concluding NASA's Space Shuttle program.
 July 22 – In Norway, Anders Behring Breivik kills 8 people in a bomb blast which targeted government buildings in central Oslo, then kills 69 at a massacre at a Workers' Youth League camp on the island of Utøya.
 July 31 – In Thailand over 12.8 million people are affected by severe flooding. The World Bank estimates damages at 1,440 billion baht (US$45 billion). Some areas are still six feet under water, and many factory areas remain closed at the end of the year. 815 people are killed, with 58 of the country's 77 provinces affected.

August
 August – Stock exchanges worldwide suffer heavy losses due to the fears of contagion of the European sovereign debt crisis and the credit rating downgraded as a result of the debt-ceiling crisis of the United States.
 August 5
 NASA announces that its Mars Reconnaissance Orbiter has captured photographic evidence of possible liquid water on Mars during warm seasons.
 Juno, the first solar-powered spacecraft on a mission to Jupiter, is launched from Cape Canaveral Air Force Station.
 August 20–28 – Libyan rebels take control of the capital Tripoli, effectively overthrowing the government of Muammar Gaddafi.

September
 September 5 – India and Bangladesh sign a pact to end their 40-year border demarcation dispute.
 	September 9 – October 23 – The 2011 Rugby World Cup is won by  New Zealand
 September 10 – The MV Spice Islander I, carrying at least 800 people, sinks off the coast of Zanzibar, killing 240 people.
 September 12 – Approximately 100 people die after a petrol pipeline explodes in Nairobi.
 September 17 –  Occupy Wall Street protests begin in the United States. This develops into the Occupy movement which spreads to 82 countries by October.
 September 19 – With 436 dead, the United Nations launches a $357 million appeal for victims of the 2011 Sindh floods in Pakistan.

October
 October 4 – The death toll from the flooding of Cambodia's Mekong river and attendant flash floods reaches 207.
 October 18
 Gilad Shalit prisoner exchange: Israel and the Palestinian militant organization Hamas begin a major prisoner exchange, in which the captured Israeli Army soldier Gilad Shalit is released by Hamas in exchange for 1,027 Palestinian and Israeli-Arab prisoners held in Israel, including 280 prisoners serving life sentences for planning and perpetrating terror attacks.
 Dozens of exotic animals were released from their enclosures at the Muskingum County Animal Farm in Zanesville, Ohio resulting in the need of local law enforcement to hunt and kill 48 animals including 18 tigers, 6 black bears, 2 grizzly bears, 2 wolves, 1 macaque monkey, 1 baboon, 3 mountain lions and 17 African lions
 October 20
 Libyan leader Muammar Gaddafi is killed in Sirte, with National Transitional Council forces taking control of the city and ending the war.
 Basque separatist militant organisation ETA declares an end to its 43-year campaign of political violence, which has killed over 800 people since 1968.
 October 23 – A magnitude 7.2 Mw earthquake jolts eastern Turkey near the city of Van, killing over 600 people and damaging about 2,200 buildings.
 October 27 – After an emergency meeting in Brussels, the European Union announces an agreement to tackle the European sovereign debt crisis which includes a writedown of 50% of Greek bonds, a recapitalisation of European banks and an increase of the bailout fund of the European Financial Stability Facility totaling to €1 trillion.
 October 29 – A large snowstorm produced unusual amounts of early snowfall across the northeastern United States and the Canadian Maritimes, leaving 1.7 million people without power and disrupting travel.
 October 31
 Date selected by the UN as the symbolic date when global population reaches seven billion.
 UNESCO admits Palestine as a member, following a vote which 107 member states support and 14 oppose.

November
 November 18 – Mojang Studios releases the blockbuster video game Minecraft.
 November 26 –The Mars Science Laboratory rover Curiosity, is launched from the Kennedy Space Center. It lands on Mars on August 6, 2012.
 November 30 – The United Kingdom severs diplomatic relations with Iran and expels diplomats, less than 24 hours after protesters attacked the British embassy in Tehran.

December
 December 15 – The United States formally declares an end to the Iraq War. While this ends the insurgency, it begins another.
 December 16 – Tropical Storm Washi causes 1,268 flash flood fatalities in the Philippines, with 85 people officially listed as missing.
 December 17 – North Korean leader Kim Jong-il dies of either a heart attack or stroke on his way to a field guidance.
 December 19 – Liechtenstein becomes the 26th member state of the Schengen Area.
 December 29 – Samoa and Tokelau move from east to west of the International Date Line, thereby skipping December 30, in order to align their time zones better with their main trading partners.

Births and Deaths

Nobel Prizes

 Chemistry – Dan Shechtman
 Economics – Christopher A. Sims and Thomas J. Sargent
 Literature – Tomas Tranströmer
 Peace – Ellen Johnson Sirleaf, Leymah Gbowee and Tawakkol Karman
 Physics – Saul Perlmutter, Adam Riess, and Brian Schmidt
 Physiology or Medicine – Bruce Beutler, Jules A. Hoffmann, and Ralph M. Steinman

New English words
blockchain

See also

References